England v President's Overseas XV was a 1971 rugby union match between  and a President's Overseas XV. The match was played to celebrate the centenary of the Rugby Football Union. The President's Overseas XV won 28-11.

As preparation for the international match the President's XV played and won three other matches against regional selections: London, Midland & Home Counties, the North and the South & South West Counties.

The game was played at Twickenham in front of 50,000 spectators. Test caps were awarded, and Dixon and Creed earned their first caps for England in this match.

Squads

President's Overseas

Match details 

|}

See also
 World XV

Bibliography
 Starmer-Smith, Nigel (ed) Rugby - A Way of Life, An Illustrated History of Rugby (Lennard Books, 1986 ) pp 106, 107 (including portrait of each player)

References

England national rugby union team matches
1970–71 in English rugby union
1970–71 in French rugby union
1971 in Australian rugby union
1971 in New Zealand rugby union
1971 in South African rugby union
World XV matches
April 1971 sports events in the United Kingdom